Hülya Nergis (born 1967 in Kayseri, Turkey) is a Turkish politician and lawyer and a member of the Turkish Parliament for the Justice and Development Party

References 

Living people
1967 births
Turkish political people